Berkswich is a civil parish in the borough of Stafford in Staffordshire, England. According to the 2001 census it had a population of 1,528, being recalculated as 2,010 at the 2011 Census.

Berkswich Civil Parish should not be confused with Berkswich Church of England Parish in the Lichfield Diocese as they cover differing geographical areas. Berkswich Civil Parish covers the villages of Walton-on-the-Hill and Milford. Berkswich Church of England Parish covers those villages along with Baswich, Weeping Cross and Wildwood. Berkswich can be found on the south-eastern fringe of Stafford.

On 24 March 1976 the parish was renamed from "Baswich" to "Berkswich".

See also
Listed buildings in Berkswich

References

External links
St. Thomas Church, Berkswich, Minton Tiles
The Parish of Berkswich, History of St Thomas Church

Civil parishes in Staffordshire
Stafford